Askel lähempänä Saatanaa (Finnish for "a step closer to Satan") is the eighth studio album by the Finnish black metal band Horna. It was released on February 23, 2013. It is the band's first full-length studio album to feature Spellgoth on vocals, having replaced Corvus.

Track listing
Alku - 01:55 (instrumental)　(English: Beginning)
Askel lähempänä Saatanaa - 06:30　(English: A Step Closer to Satan)
Kunnia herralle, kuninkaalle - 04:40　(English: Glory to the Lord, the King)
Kuolema kuoleman jälkeen - 03:53　(English: Death After Death)
Ei aikaa kyyneleille - 04:43　(English: No Time for Tears)
Kärsimyksin vuoltu hänen valittuna äänenään - 06:57　(English: With Misery Crafted as His/Her Chosen Voice)
Aamutähden pyhimys - 06:15　(English: Saint of the Morning Star)
Pala tai palvele - 04:21　(English: Burn or Serve)
Ota omaksesi, luoksesi - 04:47　(English: Take (It) for Yourself, to You)

Personnel
Shatraug - Guitars
Infection - Guitars
Vainaja - Drums
Spellgoth - Vocals
Hex Inferi - Bass

Additional
Antti "Nuitar" Saukkonen - Artwork
Elena Vasilaki - Photography, Layout
Shatraug - Layout
Christophe Szpajdel - logo

References 

Horna albums
2013 albums